Mads Henry Andenæs (22 April 1940 – 12 May 2019) was a Norwegian legal academic.

He was born in Oslo as a son of Johs. Andenæs. He took the dr.juris degree in 1978 on the thesis Sameier og selskaper, and was appointed as a professor at the University of Oslo in 1986. Other publications include Aksjeselskapsrett (2nd ed. 1992), Konkurs (2nd ed. 1999), Rettskildelære (1997) og Aksjeselskaper & allmennaksjeselskaper (1998).

He was married to Ellen Holager Andenæs. In his youth he was a javelin thrower, with a personal best throw of 73.12 metres at Bislett stadion in 1960. He represented the club IK Tjalve, having represented St. Hanshaugens IF as a teenager. He died in his home, aged 79.

References

1940 births
2019 deaths
Athletes from Oslo
Norwegian male javelin throwers
Norwegian legal scholars
Academic staff of the Faculty of Law, University of Oslo